Anolis sericeus, the  silky anole, is a species of lizard in the family Dactyloidae. The species is found in Mexico, Guatemala, and Costa Rica.

References

Anoles
Reptiles of Mexico
Reptiles of Guatemala
Reptiles of Costa Rica
Reptiles described in 1856
Taxa named by Edward Hallowell (herpetologist)